The DAC RangeR is a Dutch amateur-built aircraft, that was designed and produced by the Dutch Aeroplane Company (DAC), of Dordrecht. When it was available the aircraft was supplied as a kit for amateur construction.

Design and development
The RangeR is a development of the Lucas Dieselis and features a cantilever low-wing, a two-seats-in-side-by-side configuration enclosed cockpit under a bubble canopy, fixed tricycle landing gear and a single engine in tractor configuration.

The aircraft is made from composite sandwiches. The standard powerplant available is the  DAC YDT 1.7 litre diesel engine, developed by the airframe designers and based upon an Isuzu design.

By 2015 the aircraft had gone through a redesign, with an enlarged cockpit and a new wing design by Martin Holloman added, but by the end of 2015 the company website was taken down and the company seemed to be out of business.

Specifications (RangeR)

References

External links
Official website archive on Archive.org

Homebuilt aircraft
Single-engined tractor aircraft